Anita Daher is an author, screenwriter, producer, show host and actor based in Winnipeg, Manitoba. She has worked in book publishing since 1995 and has published in print, audio and e-book format in Canada, the United States, and Europe. She is also an actor on stage and screen. In 2020, she began to produce and host an author interview series called Made in Manitoba: Stories from Home airing on Shaw Winnipeg's community access channel, as well as the YouTube Channel, Made in Manitoba Book TV.

Daher was born in Summerside, Prince Edward Island, where she spent her childhood and the first two decades of her adult years moving every few years from one part of the country to the next. This wandering may have influenced her writing style. She has become known for bringing a strong sense of place into her stories. She feels that what she really writes about is "connection".

Daher sat as Chair of the Writers' Union of Canada from 2019-2021, the first two-year term Chair in the Union's history.

Bibliography

Flight from Big Tangle (2002)
Flight from Bear Canyon (2004)
Racing for Diamonds (2007)
Spider's Song (2007)
Two Foot Punch (2007)
Poachers in the Pingos (2008)
On the Trail of the Bushman (2009)
The Wilderness Cure (2012)
Wager the Wonder Horse (2013)
The Hustle (2013)
Itty Bitty Bits (2013)
Wonder Horse (2015)
Forgetting How to Breathe (2018)
You Don't Have to Die in the End (2020)
Peanut Butter and Chaos (2022)

Awards
Winner, John Hirsch Award for Most Promising New Writer, 2007
Finalist, Spider's Song, Arthur Ellis Award, 2008
Finalist, Racing for Diamonds, Arthur Ellis Award, 2008
Finalist, Racing for Diamonds, Hackmatack Award, 2009
Long List, Mime, CBC Literary Prize, 2017 
Finalist, Forgetting How to Breathe, IODE Violet Downey Book Award, 2019 
Finalist, You Don't Have to Die in the End, Forest of Reading White Pine Award, 2021 
Finalist, You Don't Have to Die in the End, Manitoba Book Award, Best YA Novel, 2021

References

External links 
 Manitoba Writers Guild Profile
 Winnipeg International Writers Festival Biography
 Anita Daher official website
 

Canadian women children's writers
Canadian writers of young adult literature
Living people
People from Summerside, Prince Edward Island
Writers from Prince Edward Island
Writers from Winnipeg
Women writers of young adult literature
Year of birth missing (living people)